Daniel W. Drezner (born August 23, 1968) is an American political scientist. He is professor of international politics at The Fletcher School of Law and Diplomacy at Tufts University. He is known for his scholarship and commentary on International Relations and International Political Economy.

Education
Drezner graduated from Williams College with a B.A. degree in political economy in 1990. He received his M.A. and Ph.D. degree from Stanford University. Stephen Krasner was his advisor at Stanford University.

Political views
Drezner rarely discusses his political loyalties, but in 2011 he wrote: "I find liberals write 'even conservative Dan Drezner...' while conservatives often deploy terms like 'academic elitist' or 'RINO.' In my case, at this point in time, I believe that last appellation to be entirely fair and accurate. I'm not a Democrat, and I don't think I've become more liberal over time."

Drezner supported the 2003 U.S. invasion of Iraq, writing that "a successful invasion not only eliminates the Iraqi threat, but over the long run it reduces the Arab resentment that feeds Al-Qaeda."

Drezner was a signatory to a March 2016 open letter by Republican national security community members that opposed Donald Trump as the Republican nominee for U.S. president. Drezner announced in July 2017 that he is no longer part of the Republican Party.
In October 2017, he recommended resignation to Secretary of State Rex Tillerson.

Books and commentary
Drezner has published columns, essays, and op-eds in many media outlets, including The New Republic, Foreign Affairs, Foreign Policy, The New York Times, Slate, Tech Central Station, and The Wall Street Journal. He has also been a frequent guest on Bloggingheads.tv and various other broadcast media. He originally blogged on his website, DanielDrezner.com, but moved in January 2009 to become a contributing blogger at ForeignPolicy.com.  Drezner then moved to The Washington Post in 2014. He has moderated and spoken at various Council on Foreign Relations events.

Drezner's 2007 book, All Politics Is Global: Explaining International Regulatory Regimes, looked at international economic regulations and concluded that these were under the control of the most wealthy and powerful nations, as they had been in the past. G. John Ikenberry in Foreign Affairs comments:  "His main contribution, however, is to explode a popular notion of globalization and thereby to set an agenda for the study of global regulatory politics. For social movements seeking to shape the governance of the world economy, all roads still lead to the state."

Drezner's 2011 book, Theories of International Politics and Zombies, speculated about different ways the international community might respond to a zombie outbreak, although he "concedes that the statistical probability of such an event is extremely difficult to determine but generally thought to be low." Oliver Stuenkel, writing in Post-Western World, commented: "Drezner's book is a must-read for young international relations scholars, considering the vast attention this topic is likely to get in the future."

Drezner's 2014 book, The System Worked: How the World Stopped Another Great Depression, examines the financial crisis of 2007–2008. In it, Drezner praises the international response to the crisis and says that a major economic depression was averted. Jonathan Kirshner, in his review in Boston Review, said the book was "smart, thoughtful, and important" but disagreed with Drezner on the issues of free trade and globalization.

Drezner has been characterized as one of the most influential scholars and commentators on the international political economy of money and finance.

He is a nonresident senior fellow at the Project on International Order and Strategy at the Brookings Institution.

Drezner also co-hosts the "Space The Nation" podcast, which "looks at science fiction through the lens of political science and [insert trendy academic theory here]."

Selected publications

Books

 Drezner, Daniel W. (2020). The Toddler in Chief: What Donald Trump Teaches Us about the Modern Presidency. Chicago: Chicago University Press.

As editor

 The Uses and Abuses of Weaponized Interdependence. Brookings Institution Press, 2021.

Peer-reviewed journal articles
  Pdf.

References

External links

 Drezner's blog at ForeignPolicy.com
 
 Drezner's debates and discussions at Bloggingheads.tv

1968 births
American male bloggers
American bloggers
American male journalists
Massachusetts Republicans
American political writers
Foreign policy writers
Harvard University staff
Living people
Writers from Syracuse, New York
Stanford University alumni
The Fletcher School at Tufts University faculty
Video bloggers
Williams College alumni
Journalists from New York (state)
21st-century American non-fiction writers